The 2011 Morehead State Eagles football team represented Morehead State University in the 2011 NCAA Division I FCS football season. The Eagles were led by 18th-year head coach Matt Ballard and played their home games at Jayne Stadium. They are a member of the Pioneer Football League. They finished the season 3–8, 2–6 in PFL play to finish the season in a tie for eighth place.

Schedule

References

Morehead State
Morehead State Eagles football seasons
Morehead State Eagles football